Ionela Stanca (née Gâlcă; born 9 January 1981) is a Romanian professional handballer who plays for Chambray Touraine Handball. She was voted into the All-Star Team in the 2007 World Women's Handball Championship.

Achievements

Clubs 
Croatian Cup:
Winner: 2004
Romanian Championship
Winner: 2007, 2008, 2010, 2011, 2012
Cupa României
Winner: 2007, 2011
Romanian Supercup
Winner: 2007
EHF Champions League:
Finalist: 2010
Semifinalist: 2012
EHF Champions Trophy:
Winner: 2007
EHF Cup Winners' Cup:
Winner: 2007
EHF Cup:
Semifinalist: 2009
Coupe de France
Winner: 2014

National team
Junior European Championship:
Gold Medalist: 1999
Youth European Championship:
Gold Medalist: 2000
World Championship:
Silver Medalist: 2005
Fourth Place: 2007
European Championship:
Bronze Medalist: 2010
Fifth Place: 2008

Individual awards
 Romanian National League Top Scorer: 2007

Stats 
Goals in Europeans’ Cups:

References

External links
Profile at eurohandball.com

1981 births
Living people
Sportspeople from Constanța
Romanian female handball players
Olympic handball players of Romania
Handball players at the 2008 Summer Olympics
Expatriate handball players
Romanian expatriates in Croatia
Romanian expatriates in France
SCM Râmnicu Vâlcea (handball) players
RK Podravka Koprivnica players